Winner is an unincorporated community in Clay County, in the U.S. state of Missouri.

History
A post office called Winner was established in 1891, and remained in operation until 1900. W. E. Winner, the founder, gave the community his last name.

References

Unincorporated communities in Clay County, Missouri
Unincorporated communities in Missouri